is the railway station in Nagayo, Nishisonogi District, Nagasaki Prefecture, Japan. It is operated by JR Kyushu and is on the Nagasaki Main Line.

Lines
Only local trains run on this branch.

Station layout 
The station consists of a side platform serving a single track at grade. The station building is a timber structure of traditional Japanese design and houses a waiting room and staffed ticket window. A bike shed and parking lots are available at the station forecourt. Across from the platform can be seen the remnants of another, disused platform and the trackbed of a second track, now removed.

Management of the station has been outsourced to the JR Kyushu Tetsudou Eigyou Co., a wholly owned subsidiary of JR Kyushu specialising in station services. It staffs the ticket window which is equipped with a POS machine but does not have a Midori no Madoguchi facility.

Adjacent stations

History
On the same day, Michinoo was opened as an intermediate station between Urakami and Nagayo. When the Kyushu Railway was nationalized on 1 July 1907, Japanese Government Railways (JGR) took over control of the station. On 12 October 1909, track from Tosu through Haiki, Ōmura, Michinoo to Nagasaki was designated the Nagasaki Main Line. On 2 October 1972, a shorter inland bypass route was opened between  through  to Urakami was opened, which became known as the new line or Ichinuno branch of the Nagasaki Main Line. The section serving Michinoo became known as the old line or the Nagayo branch. With the privatization of Japanese National Railways (JNR), the successor of JGR, on 1 April 1987, control of the station passed to JR Kyushu.

Passenger statistics
In fiscal 2016, the station was used by an average of 987 passengers daily (boarding passengers only), and it ranked 166th  among the busiest stations of JR Kyushu.

Environs
Route 206
Seiyū Michinoo Store
Nagasaki City Iwaya Junior High School
Nagasaki Technical High School
Nagasaki Iwaya Post Office
Joyful Sun Michinoo Store
Nagasaki Royal Chester Hotel

References

External links
Michinoo Station (JR Kyushu)

Railway stations in Nagasaki Prefecture
Nagasaki Main Line
Railway stations in Japan opened in 1897